Fowler Unified School District is a public school district based in Fresno County, California, United States.

External links
 

School districts in Fresno County, California